John Pugh was a professional baseball outfielder who played in the Negro leagues between 1908 and 1922.

Pugh made his professional debut in 1908 with the Cuban Giants. He went on to enjoy a long career, including several seasons with the Brooklyn Royal Giants and the Bacharach Giants. Pugh spent his final professional season with the Harrisburg Giants in 1922.

References

External links
  and Seamheads

Place of birth missing
Place of death missing
Year of birth missing
Year of death missing
Bacharach Giants players
Birmingham Giants players
Brooklyn Royal Giants players
Cuban Giants players
Harrisburg Giants players
Lincoln Giants players
Lincoln Stars (baseball) players
Schenectady Mohawk Giants players
Kansas City Royal Giants players